Liolaemus is a genus of iguanian lizards, containing many species, all of which are endemic to South America.

Description 
Members of the genus Liolaemus form a dominant part of the lizard fauna of the southern part of the continent of South America, and vary considerably in size ( snout–vent length) and weight.

Geographic range 
Liolaemus species are found in the Andes and adjacent lowlands, from Peru to Tierra del Fuego, at altitudes that can exceed .

Liolaemus magellanicus and Liolaemus sarmientoi are the world's southernmost reptiles, living as far south as Isla Granda de Tierra del Fuego and the northern shores of the Strait of Magellan respectively.

Diet 
Most species of Liolaemus are omnivorous, but a few purely insectivorous and herbivorous species are known.

Species 
There are more than 225 described species in the genus Liolaemus, but the true number of species may be about double this number. Liolaemus is by far the largest genus of the liolaemid lizards, which are traditionally treated as subfamily Liolaeminae within the Iguanidae but more recently were proposed for upranking to full family Liolaemidae.

The following species are recognised:

Liolaemus abaucan 
Liolaemus abdalai 
Liolaemus absconditus 
Liolaemus acostai 
Liolaemus albiceps 
Liolaemus alticolor 
Liolaemus andinus 
Liolaemus annectens 
Liolaemus anomalus 
Liolaemus anqapuka  Huamaní-Valderrama, Quiroz, Gutiérrez, Aguilar-Kirigin, Chaparro & Abdala, 2020
Liolaemus antonietae 
Liolaemus antumalguen 
Liolaemus aparicioi 
Liolaemus arambarensis 
Liolaemus araucaniensis 
Liolaemus archeforus 
Liolaemus atacamensis 
Liolaemus audituvelatus 
Liolaemus aureum 
Liolaemus austromendocinus 
Liolaemus avilae 
Liolaemus azarai 
Liolaemus baguali 
Liolaemus balagueri 
Liolaemus balerion 
Liolaemus basadrei 
Liolaemus bellii 
Liolaemus bibronii 
Liolaemus bitaeniatus 
Liolaemus boulengeri 
Liolaemus brizuelai 
Liolaemus buergeri 
Liolaemus burmeisteri 
Liolaemus calchaqui 
Liolaemus calliston 
Liolaemus canqueli 
Liolaemus caparensis 
Liolaemus capillitas 
Liolaemus carlosgarini 
Liolaemus casamiquelai 
Liolaemus cazianiae 
Liolaemus chacabucoense 
Liolaemus chacoensis 
Liolaemus chaltin 
Liolaemus chavin 
Liolaemus chehuachekenk 
Liolaemus chiliensis  
Liolaemus chillanensis 
Liolaemus chiribaya 
Liolaemus chlorostictus 
Liolaemus chungara 
Liolaemus cinereus 
Liolaemus coeruleus 
Liolaemus confusus 
Liolaemus constanzae 
Liolaemus crandalli 
Liolaemus cranwelli 
Liolaemus crepuscularis 
Liolaemus cristiani 
Liolaemus curicensis 
Liolaemus curis 
Liolaemus cuyanus 
Liolaemus cuyumhue 
Liolaemus cyaneinotatus 
Liolaemus cyanogaster 
Liolaemus darwinii 
Liolaemus diaguita 
Liolaemus dicktracyi 
Liolaemus disjunctus 
Liolaemus ditadai 
Liolaemus donosobarrosi 
Liolaemus dorbignyi 
Liolaemus duellmani 
Liolaemus dumerili 
Liolaemus eleodori 
Liolaemus elongatus 
Liolaemus erguetae 
Liolaemus erroneus 
Liolaemus escarchadosi 
Liolaemus espinozai 
Liolaemus etheridgei 
Liolaemus evaristoi 
Liolaemus exploratorum 
Liolaemus fabiani 
Liolaemus famatinae 
Liolaemus fittkaui 
Liolaemus fitzgeraldi 
Liolaemus fitzingerii 
Liolaemus flavipiceus 
Liolaemus forsteri 
Liolaemus foxi 
Liolaemus frassinettii 
Liolaemus fuscus 
 Liolaemus galactostictos 
Liolaemus gallardoi 
Liolaemus gardeli 
Liolaemus goetschi 
Liolaemus gracielae 
Liolaemus gracilis 
Liolaemus gravenhorstii 
Liolaemus griseus 
Liolaemus grosseorum 
Liolaemus gununakuna 
Liolaemus hajeki 
Liolaemus halonastes 
Liolaemus hatcheri 
Liolaemus hauthali 
Liolaemus heliodermis 
Liolaemus hellmichi 
Liolaemus hermannunezi 
Liolaemus huacahuasicus 
Liolaemus huayra 
Liolaemus hugoi 
Liolaemus igneus 
Liolaemus inacayali 
Liolaemus incaicus 
Liolaemus insolitus 
Liolaemus inti 
Liolaemus irregularis 
Liolaemus isabelae 
Liolaemus islugensis 
Liolaemus jamesi 
Liolaemus janequeoae 
Liolaemus josei 
Liolaemus juanortizi 
Liolaemus kingii 
Liolaemus kolengh 
Liolaemus koslowskyi 
Liolaemus kriegi 
Liolaemus kunza 
Liolaemus laurenti 
Liolaemus lavillai 
Liolaemus leftrarui 
Liolaemus lemniscatus 
Liolaemus lentus 
Liolaemus lenzi 
Liolaemus leopardinus 
Liolaemus lineomaculatus 
Liolaemus loboi 
Liolaemus lonquimayensis 
Liolaemus lopezi 
Liolaemus lorenzmuelleri 
Liolaemus lutzae 
Liolaemus magellanicus 
Liolaemus maldonadae 
Liolaemus mapuche 
Liolaemus martorii 
Liolaemus melaniceps 
Liolaemus melanogaster 
Liolaemus melanopleurus 
Liolaemus melanops 
Liolaemus meraxes 
Liolaemus messii 
Liolaemus millcayac 
Liolaemus molinai 
Liolaemus montanezi 
Liolaemus montanus 
Liolaemus monticola 
Liolaemus moradoensis 
Liolaemus morandae 
Liolaemus morenoi 
Liolaemus multicolor 
Liolaemus multiformis 
Liolaemus multimaculatus 
Liolaemus nazca 
Liolaemus neuquensis 
Liolaemus nigriceps 
Liolaemus nigromaculatus 
Liolaemus nigroviridis 
Liolaemus nitidus 
Liolaemus normae 
Liolaemus occipitalis 
Liolaemus olongasta 
Liolaemus omorfi 
Liolaemus orko 
Liolaemus ornatus 
Liolaemus ortizii 
Liolaemus pacha 
Liolaemus pachacutec 
Liolaemus pachecoi 
Liolaemus pagaburoi 
Liolaemus pantherinus 
Liolaemus parthenos 
Liolaemus parvus 
Liolaemus patriciaiturrae 
Liolaemus paulinae 
Liolaemus petrophilus 
Liolaemus pictus 
Liolaemus pikunche 
Liolaemus pipanaco 
Liolaemus platei 
Liolaemus pleopholis 
Liolaemus poconchilensis 
Liolaemus poecilochromus 
Liolaemus polystictus 
Liolaemus porosus 
Liolaemus pseudoanomalus 
Liolaemus pseudolemniscatus 
Liolaemus puelche 
Liolaemus pulcherrimus 
Liolaemus puna 
Liolaemus punmahuida 
Liolaemus puritamensis 
Liolaemus purul 
Liolaemus pyriphlogos 
Liolaemus qalaywa 
Liolaemus quilmes 
Liolaemus quinterosi 
Liolaemus rabinoi 
Liolaemus ramirezae 
Liolaemus reichei 
Liolaemus riojanus 
Liolaemus robertmertensi 
Liolaemus robertoi 
Liolaemus robustus 
Liolaemus rosenmanni 
Liolaemus rothi 
Liolaemus ruibali 
Liolaemus sagei 
Liolaemus salinicola 
Liolaemus salitrosus 
Liolaemus sanjuanensis 
Liolaemus sarmientoi 
Liolaemus saxatilis 
Liolaemus scapularis 
Liolaemus schmidti 
Liolaemus schroederi 
Liolaemus scolaroi 
Liolaemus scorialis 
Liolaemus scrocchii 
Liolaemus senguer 
Liolaemus septentrionalis 
Liolaemus shehuen 
Liolaemus shitan 
Liolaemus signifer 
Liolaemus silvai 
Liolaemus silvanae 
Liolaemus sitesi 
Liolaemus smaug 
Liolaemus somuncurae 
Liolaemus stolzmanni 
Liolaemus tacnae 
Liolaemus tacora 
Liolaemus tajzara 
Liolaemus talampaya 
Liolaemus tandiliensis 
Liolaemus tari 
Liolaemus tehuelche 
Liolaemus telsen 
Liolaemus tenuis 
Liolaemus terani 
Liolaemus thermarum 
Liolaemus thomasi 
Liolaemus tirantii 
Liolaemus tolhuaca 
Liolaemus torresi 
Liolaemus tregenzai 
Liolaemus tristis 
Liolaemus tromen 
Liolaemus tulkas 
Liolaemus ubaghsi 
Liolaemus umbrifer 
Liolaemus uniformis 
Liolaemus uptoni 
Liolaemus uspallatensis 
Liolaemus valdesianus 
Liolaemus vallecurensis 
Liolaemus variegatus 
Liolaemus velosoi 
Liolaemus vhagar 
Liolaemus victormoralesii 
Liolaemus villaricensis 
Liolaemus vulcanus 
Liolaemus walkeri 
Liolaemus wari 
Liolaemus warjantay 
Liolaemus wiegmannii 
Liolaemus williamsi 
Liolaemus xanthoviridis 
Liolaemus yalguaraz 
Liolaemus yanalcu 
Liolaemus yarabamba 
Liolaemus yatel 
Liolaemus yauri 
Liolaemus zabalai 
Liolaemus zapallarensis 
Liolaemus zullyae

Pets 
Some species of Liolaemus have been recently kept as pets, and as many of them originate from regions that experience cold conditions, they are named "snow swifts". More generally, the genus is known as "tree iguanas".

References

Further reading 
 Boulenger GA (1885). Catalogue of the Lizards in the British Museum (Natural History). Second Edition. Volume II. Iguanidæ ... London: Trustees of the British Museum (Natural History). (Taylor and Francis, printers). xiii + 497 pp. + Plates I-XXIV. (Genus "Liolæmus", p. 138).
 Wiegmann AFA (1834). "Beiträge zur Zoologie, gesammelt auf einer Reise um die Erde. Siebente Abhandlung. Amphibien ". Nova Acta Physico-Medica, Academiae Caesare Leopoldino-Carolinae 17: 185-268 + Plates XIII-XXII. (Liolaemus, new genus, p. 227). (in German and Latin).

External links 

Cyber Lizard A look at the Iguanids

 
Reptiles of South America
Liolaemidae
Lizard genera
Taxa named by Arend Friedrich August Wiegmann